The Epidemic Diseases Act, 1897 is a law which was first enacted to tackle bubonic plague in Mumbai (formerly Bombay) in former British India. The law is meant for containment of epidemics by providing special powers that are required for the implementation of containment measures to control the spread of the disease.

Legal provisions 
Section 2 of the Act reads:

2020 Amendments 
On 22 April 2020, the Government of India announced the promulgation of an ordinance, 'The Epidemic Diseases (Amendment) Ordinance 2020', to amend the act, adding provisions to punish those attacking doctors or health workers. The ordinance allows for up to seven years of jail for attacking doctors or health workers (including ASHA workers). The offense will be cognizable and non-bailable among other things. In addition to this, such cases need to be investigated in a time-bound and must be resolved in a year. Also, the law specifies that the guilty will have to pay twice the market value of the damaged property as compensation for damaging the assets of health care staff including vehicles and clinics.

The bill was introduced by the Minister of Health and Family Affairs, Harsh Vardhan. The Rajya Sabha approved the bill on 19 September 2020 and the Lok Sabha on 21 September 2020.

Invocations 
The Act has been routinely used to contain various diseases in India such as swine flu, cholera, malaria and dengue. In 2018, the Act was enforced as cholera began to spread in a region of Gujarat. In 2015, it was used to deal with dengue and malaria in Chandigarh and in 2009 it was invoked in Pune to combat swine flu.

Following the COVID-19 pandemic the Cabinet Secretary of India on 11 March 2020 announced that all states and Union territories should invoke provisions of Section 2 of the Epidemic Diseases Act, 1897. Since March 2020, the act is being enforced across India in order to limit the spread of COVID-19.

References

Bibliography 
 
 

Law of India
1897 in India
1897 in law
COVID-19 pandemic in India
Law associated with the COVID-19 pandemic